Bob Hewitt won the title, defeating Alejandro Olmedo 6–4, 6–3 in the final.

Draw

Finals

Top half

Bottom half

External links
 Main draw

1972 Grand Prix (tennis)
1972 Bristol Open